Georges William Thornley (2 May 1857 – 31 August 1935) was a French painter and printmaker.

Life
A student of the French landscape painter Eugène Cicéri and Edmond Yon, Thornley became a successful artist remembered for his seascapes from Normandy and his landscapes from the French and Italian Rivieras. He was the son of a Welsh immigrant Morgan Thornley.

He also was a talented watercolorist, engraver, and lithographer. His lithographs after the works of Corot, Pissarro, Degas and Puvis de Chavannes were acclaimed by his peers and awarded at the Salon de Paris.

His paintings were exhibited beginning in 1878. He won the Mention of Honor in 1881 and a Third Class medal in 1888. Thornley embraced the Impressionist movement early in his career, which brought him much success.

His style characteristically has bold brushwork and thick "impasto." It recreates the "impression of a panorama", capturing the fleeting moment in its inner light and color. This open landscape is an example of what the artist excelled at: successful color effects which are highly decorative but stay true to nature.

Notes

1857 births
1935 deaths
People from Thiais
19th-century engravers
20th-century engravers
French engravers
French lithographers
19th-century French painters
French male painters
20th-century French painters
20th-century French male artists
20th-century French printmakers
19th-century French male artists